Dendrobaena is a genus of annelids belonging to the family Lumbricidae.

The genus has cosmopolitan distribution.

Species
Species:

Dendrobaena alpina 
Dendrobaena apora 
Dendrobaena attemsi 
Dendrobaena auriculifera 
Dendrobaena baksanensis 
Dendrobaena balcanica 
Dendrobaena bogdanowii 
Dendrobaena bokakotorensis 
Dendrobaena boneiensis 
Dendrobaena bosniaca 
Dendrobaena bruna 
Dendrobaena burgosana 
Dendrobaena byblica 
Dendrobaena caucasica 
Dendrobaena cevdeti 
Dendrobaena clujensis 
Dendrobaena cognettii 
Dendrobaena colloquia 
Dendrobaena durmitorensis 
Dendrobaena epirotica 
Dendrobaena faucium 
Dendrobaena franzi 
Dendrobaena fridericae 
Dendrobaena ganglbaueri 
Dendrobaena grmecensis 
Dendrobaena hamzalensis 
Dendrobaena hauseri 
Dendrobaena hortensis 
Dendrobaena hrabei 
Dendrobaena hurcanica 
Dendrobaena hypogea 
Dendrobaena hyrcanica 
Dendrobaena ilievae 
Dendrobaena illyricus 
Dendrobaena imeretiana 
Dendrobaena jahorensis 
Dendrobaena jastrebensis 
Dendrobaena jeanneli 
Dendrobaena juliana 
Dendrobaena karacadagi 
Dendrobaena kelassuriensis 
Dendrobaena kervillei 
Dendrobaena kozuvensis 
Dendrobaena kozuvensis 
Dendrobaena kurashvilii 
Dendrobaena loebli 
Dendrobaena lumbricoides 
Dendrobaena luraensis 
Dendrobaena lusitana 
Dendrobaena macedonica 
Dendrobaena mahnerti 
Dendrobaena mahunkai 
Dendrobaena mamissonica 
Dendrobaena manherti 
Dendrobaena mariupolienis 
Dendrobaena mariupoliensis
Dendrobaena michalisi 
Dendrobaena monspessulana 
Dendrobaena montenegrina 
Dendrobaena montenegrina 
Dendrobaena montenigrina 
Dendrobaena mrazeki 
Dendrobaena mrsici 
Dendrobaena nasonowii 
Dendrobaena nassonovi 
Dendrobaena negevis 
Dendrobaena nevoi 
Dendrobaena nicaensis 
Dendrobaena nivalis 
Dendrobaena ochridana 
Dendrobaena octaedra 
Dendrobaena oltenica 
Dendrobaena omodeoi 
Dendrobaena orientalis 
Dendrobaena orientaloides 
Dendrobaena osellai 
Dendrobaena pantaleonis 
Dendrobaena papukiana 
Dendrobaena parabyblica 
Dendrobaena pavliceki 
Dendrobaena pentheri 
Dendrobaena persimilis 
Dendrobaena perula 
Dendrobaena pindonensis 
Dendrobaena platyura
Dendrobaena proandra 
Dendrobaena pseudohortensis 
Dendrobaena pseudorrosea 
Dendrobaena ressli 
Dendrobaena retrosella 
Dendrobaena riparia 
Dendrobaena rivulicola 
Dendrobaena rothschildae 
Dendrobaena ruffoi 
Dendrobaena samarigera 
Dendrobaena sasensis 
Dendrobaena schmidti 
Dendrobaena semitica 
Dendrobaena serbica 
Dendrobaena sketi 
Dendrobaena slovenica 
Dendrobaena steineri 
Dendrobaena succincta 
Dendrobaena succinta 
Dendrobaena swanetiana 
Dendrobaena szalokii 
Dendrobaena taurica 
Dendrobaena vejdovskyi 
Dendrobaena velkhovrhia 
Dendrobaena velkovrhi 
Dendrobaena veneta 
Dendrobaena verihemiandra 
Dendrobaena vraicensis 
Dendrobaena vranicensis 
Dendrobaena zicsi

References

Lumbricidae
Annelid genera